Aqeel Khan (born 30 January 1980, in Karachi) is a Pakistani tennis player. He is the current Pakistani number one and National Champion. His favourite surface is Grass. He is coached by Pakistani tennis coach Jamil Khan, who is his father. Aqeel Khan is sponsored by Jaffer Brothers (Jaffer Group of Companies).

Career
His career highlights include helping the Pakistan Davis Cup team defeat favourites, New Zealand, in the Davis Cup, by beating Simon Rea, 7–6(5), 2–6, 3–6, 6–3, 6–2 in the fifth rubber; and reaching the Davis Cup World Group play-offs against Chile in Santiago.

Despite the potential to move further up the rankings, opportunities have been limited due to a lack of funds, and not enough ITF tournaments being played in Pakistan. It means he has to travel to India to play matches.

Aqeel Khan was involved in the longest-known Davis Cup tiebreak to date when losing to Korea's Kim Young-jun in the 2003 Asia/Oceania Group I Relegation play-off 7–6, 4–6, 6–3, 7–6, with the first set tiebreak lasting 36 points. He also holds the record for playing the most ties for Pakistan in the Davis Cup, and has the best doubles partnership, with Aisam-ul-Haq Qureshi, for Pakistan.

His younger brother is Jalil Khan, the Pakistan number 3 and Davis Cupper. He also has another youth tennis playing brother called Yasir Khan.

Aqeel Khan began playing tennis at the age of 9, whilst attending school in Karachi to avoid doing duties as a ball boy. He began playing junior tennis in 1993 at the Pakistan International Junior Championships.

He turned pro in 1998 and played his first Davis Cup match in Islamabad, Pakistan, beating Sanjeev Tikaram of Pacific Oceania, 6–1, 6–3.

In 2002, at the Asian Games, he reached the second round in the singles, doubles and team events. In 2004, he made it to the final of the ITF India 1 Satellite Masters tournament in Gurgaon. He then went on to win two of the three legs of the ITF Satellite Championship in Pakistan, and finished off by winning the Pakistan Satellite Masters in Karachi. He won a singles Futures tournament in Hyderabad, India, and also won the Indian DSCL National tennis championship in New Delhi. Aqeel also won a doubles Satellite title in Pakistan.

In 2005 he won a Satellite title in India and twice made it into the finals. Aqeel Khan also got to two doubles Futures Finals in Iran. He won Bronze in the Tennis singles event at the Islamic Solidarity Games in Mecca, Saudi Arabia 2005, where he also won Gold with Aisam-ul-Haq Qureshi in the doubles, and Gold in team event. Also he played in the Davis Cup playoff against Chile in Santiago, when he was thrashed by then current Olympic medalist Fernando González 6–0, 6–0 6–1 in the first rubber.

He also won a Satellite in India in 2006. In the doubles, he also won the India 2 Masters satellite in Delhi. In the first Indo-Pak tennis series, he and Aisam-ul-Haq Qureshi were beaten in the 5 rubber tournament 3–2. At the 2006 Asian Games, he reached the second round in singles, and paired with Qureshi, he reached the quarter-finals, losing to eventual winners and first seeds Leander Paes and Mahesh Bhupathi 6–2, 6–4.

In 2007, Aqeel Khan won a futures tournament in Ludhiana, India. He represented Pakistan at the Asian tennis championship in Tashkent, Uzbekistan, seeded sixth, but lost in the second round. In the doubles he partnered Indian Aditya Madkekar, but was knocked out at the quarter-finals. He then went on to win his second futures title of the year at Lahore, Pakistan.

In 2008 Aqeel Khan was called up the Pakistan Davis Cup squad and prepared for the hectic Asia/Oceania Group III schedule. During the Davis Cup, he was inspired form, as Pakistan won each tie 3–0 to gain promotion back to Asia/Oceania Group II. He went to New Delhi, India to play in his first Challenger level tournament, however he was knocked out in both singles and doubles in the first round. Later in the year he reach a futures final in New Delhi, India but was defeated. In October, he made it to the doubles final in Lahore, Pakistan.

He returned to Davis Cup action in 2009, and won his rubber against Oman in the first round of the Asia/Oceania Group II. To get some match practice ahead of the Davis Cup match against the Philippines, Aqeel was sent to Malaysia to play in a futures tournament in Kuala Lumpur. He reached the doubles final with Malaysian Si Yew Ming, but were defeated by the first seeds. Without Aisam Qureshi, Pakistan went down in the Davis Cup 3–2 to the Philippines. Aisam's decision to play at an ATP tournament was criticised by Aqeel who felt they were let down by him.

After which opportunities for Aqeel to play aboard were few and far between, mostly being restricted to Davis Cup matches. In 2010, he helped Pakistan beat Hong Kong, only to lose to New Zealand 3–2 in the next round. He also took part in the Commonwealth Games where he reached the second round in the singles and the first round in the doubles. In the Asian Games, he was Pakistan's sole representative in tennis but could go no further than the second round.

In 2011, Pakistan once again beat Hong Kong in the first round of the Davis Cup, but lost 4–0 to South Korea to remain in Group II. Outside of playing tennis, he also coached Sri Lanka in 2011 for their Group III matches, who went on to win every match and gain promotion to Group II for 2012.

Singles titles

Singles runner-up

Doubles titles

Doubles runner-up

Other career finals

Doubles

External links
 
 
 Aqeel Khan Recent Match Results
 From ball-boy to Pakistan’s No. 2
 Meeting with President
 Aqeel and tennis go hand in hand
 For Aqeel, India is home away from home
 We were let down by Aisam, says Aqeel
 Aqeel off to Sri Lanka for coaching stint
 Aqeel delighted by Sri Lanka success in Davis Cup
 Pakistan’s tennis talent needs to be groomed
 Pakistan Tennis’ Greatest Lost Talent

Pakistani male tennis players
1980 births
Living people
Asian Games competitors for Pakistan
Commonwealth Games competitors for Pakistan
Tennis players at the 2010 Commonwealth Games
Racket sportspeople from Karachi
Tennis players at the 1998 Asian Games
Tennis players at the 2002 Asian Games
Tennis players at the 2006 Asian Games
Tennis players at the 2010 Asian Games
Tennis players at the 2014 Asian Games
Tennis players at the 2018 Asian Games
Islamic Solidarity Games competitors for Pakistan
Islamic Solidarity Games medalists in tennis
South Asian Games silver medalists for Pakistan
South Asian Games bronze medalists for Pakistan
South Asian Games medalists in tennis